Studio Voltaire is a non-profit  gallery and artist studios based in Clapham, South  London. The organisation focuses on contemporary arts, staging a celebrated  public programme of exhibitions, performances, and live events. Studio Voltaire invests in the  production of new work and often gives artists their first opportunity for a  solo exhibition in London. The gallery space is housed in a  Victorian former Methodist Chapel and artist commissions frequently take the  form of site-specific installation, focusing on the unique architecture of the  space. Studio Voltaire also provides  affordable workspace to over 40 artists and hosts artist residencies with a  variety of national and international partners. Since 2011 the Not Our Class programme  has provided a series of participation and research projects for local audiences. In 2011 Studio Voltaire was  awarded with regular funding from Arts Council England as a  National Portfolio Organisation.
Joe Scotland is the Director of Studio Voltaire.

National exhibitions and events

1994
Studio Voltaire established in  Voltaire Road, Clapham, by a small artist collective.

1999
Studio Voltaire moved to its  current location in a former Methodist Chapel at Nelson’s Row, Clapham

2005
Studio Voltaire produced its  first Print Portfolio including editions by acclaimed artists Jeremy Deller, Mark Titchner and Spartacus Chetwynd. The organisation has subsequently developed  a strong reputation for producing affordably priced artist editions, including  works by Cory Arcangel, Ryan McGinley and Wolfgang Tillmans.
 Studio Voltaire commissioned Spartacus Chetwynd’s The Walk to Dover, the artist’s first offsite project, involving a week-long expedition from London to Dover

2006
 Studio Voltaire began an artist  residency programme in collaboration with the Berlin Cultural Senate and Whitechapel Gallery, London to host a Berlin-based artist with workspace for a 10-month period.
 Elizabeth Price presented her first video work A Public Lecture & Exhumation

2007
 Georgian-born artist Thea Djordjadze presented Possibility Nansen, her first exhibition in the  UK following a residency period at Studio Voltaire

2009
 Studio Voltaire commissioned Nairy Baghramian’s exhibition Butcher, Barber, Angler & Others, the artist’s first exhibition in the UK.
 Cathy Wilkes presented a mixed media installation entitled Mummy’s here, the first  exhibition since her nomination for the Turner Prize in 2008.

2010
 Phyllida Barlow’s  critically acclaimed installation Bluff led to widespread recognition  for the artist, including a subsequent presentation with Nairy Baghramian at the Serpentine Gallery and commercial representation with Hauser & Wirth.
 Studio Voltaire established House  of Voltaire, an offsite temporary shop.

2011
 Studio Voltaire initiated Not  Our Class, a programme of education and participatory projects exploring  the legacy of photographer Jo Spence. Collaborators included Marysia  Lewandowska and The Jo Spence Memorial Archive, Rehana Zaman working with King’s College Hospital and Body & Soul, research group X Marks The Spot and Intoart.
 Mark Francis Writer, Curator and  Director, Gagosian Gallery, London appointed as Chair of Trustees.

2012
 In collaboration with Space Studio Voltaire mounted the first major retrospective of  photographer Jo Spence on the twentieth anniversary of her death.

2021
In 2021 Studio Voltaire reopened following a £2.8m renovation project designed by the architects Matheson Whiteley. The project took existing studio space for 30 artists and increased its capacity to 75, as well as improving the quality and heating of the studios. Studio Voltaire's design shop, House of Voltaire, was given a permanent home as part of the renovation works.

References

External links 
 Studio Voltaire website 

Art museums and galleries in London
London Borough of Lambeth
Tourist attractions in the London Borough of Lambeth